McKaig-Hatch was a tool manufacturer for the automotive industry. The company, based out of Buffalo, New York made economy tools, and produced and supplied the screwdriver, pliers, and  open-end wrenches in the pouch tool kits supplied with new Ford and GM cars from the 1930s through the 1950s.

McKaig-Hatch was founded in Buffalo, New York in 1913 by Archibald McKaig, Harry C. Young, and Chauncey R. Hatch.  McKaig-Hatch became a division of Tasa Coal Company, which later became Tasa Corporation.

See also
 List of defunct consumer brands

References

External links
McKaig-Hatch, Inc. details 

Defunct consumer brands
Defunct companies based in New York (state)
Tool manufacturing companies of the United States
Automotive tool manufacturers
Manufacturing companies based in New York (state)